American Book Review is a literary journal operating out of the University of Houston-Victoria. Their mission statement is to “specialize in reviews of frequently neglected published works of fiction, poetry, and literary and cultural criticism from small, regional, university, ethnic, avant-garde, and women's presses.”

In addition to publishing the American Book Review six times a year, American Book Review and the University of Houston-Victoria organize the UHV/ABR Reading Series. Hosting over a hundred speakers since the American Book Review'''s conception, the reading series “features nationally recognized writers on extended visits to the Victoria campus.” Guests read from their most recent works, participate in discussion with UHV faculty and staff, and offer signed editions of their work for purchasing.

History
The American Book Review was founded in 1977 by Ronald Sukenick. According to author and essayist Raymond Federman, in his reading with American Book Review in 2007, Sukenick founded the American Book Review because The New York Times had stopped reviewing books by “that group labeled experimental writers,” and Sukenick wanted to start a “journal where we can review books that everyone is ignoring.”  Federman and Sukenick both funded the beginning of American Book Review, with the “American” in the title suggesting that the journal would review books from all across American and not primarily focus on books from New York.

Originally operating out of University of Colorado at Boulder in 1987, ABR later moved to Illinois State University in 1995. In The Employment of English, Michael Bérubé writes, "When Ron Sukenick folded the University of Colorado (Boulder) branch of FC2, Normal also picked up publication of American Book Review, one of the liveliest general-purpose reader’s guides for everything." Rochelle Ratner served as the publication's longtime executive editor.

The publication then moved to the University of Houston-Victoria in 2006. 
In 2009, ABR, through an agreement with Johns Hopkins University Press, allowed online editions of its issues to be available through the database ProjectMuse. The current American Book Review'' staff includes Jeffrey R. Di Leo as publisher and editor, Jeffrey A. Sartain as managing editor, and JJ Hernandez as assistant editor.

References

External links
 Official Website

Bimonthly magazines published in the United States
Book review magazines
Literary magazines published in the United States
Magazines established in 1977
Magazines published in Colorado
Magazines published in Illinois
Magazines published in Texas